Zandra is a town and union council of Ziarat District in the Balochistan province of Pakistan. Zandra had a population of 7897 in the 2017 census. It is known in Pakistan for its cherry orchards.

References

Populated places in Ziarat District
Union councils of Balochistan, Pakistan